KEGA (101.5 FM), branded as 101.5 The Eagle is a country music radio station broadcasting to the Salt Lake City metropolitan area. Licensed to Oakley, Utah, United States, the station is currently owned by Dell Loy Hansen, through licensee Broadway Media LS, LLC of Salt Lake City.  The station's studios are located in Downtown Salt Lake City and its transmitter site is located on Humpy Peak, 50 miles east.

History
The station was assigned the call letters KPKK on 2000-06-28.  On 2003-07-03, the station changed its call sign to KKIK. On July 30, 2003, the station became the current KEGA.

KEGA can be heard in HD via KUUU-HD3 92.5FM

Air staff
Current DJ Lineup:

Rick & Carly: 6:00 AM-10:00 AM

Randy "Bubba" Black: 10:00 AM-2:00 PM

Pat "The Outlaw" Garrett: 2:00 PM-6:00 PM

References

External links
101.5 The Eagle Official website

Country radio stations in the United States
EGA
Mass media in Salt Lake City
Radio stations established in 2000